Szedres is a village in Tolna County, Hungary.

It was founded by István Bezerédj (1796 - 1856) for cotton production.

External links 
 Street map 

Populated places in Tolna County